Quanjian Group Co., Ltd. is a Chinese herbal medicine company based in Tianjin. The group is the parent company of Quanjian Nature Medicine Technology Development Co., Ltd. for about 75.36% stake. 

In January 2019, law enforcement from Tianjin, arrested the owner of Quanjian Group as well as other people, accusing them for illegal multi-level marketing (multi-level marketing is illegal in Mainland China, but direct selling is not) and false advertisement on the product of Quanjian.

Football
The group was the ultimate parent company of Tianjin Quanjian F.C., which was a wholly owned subsidiary of Quanjian Nature Medicine. The Chinese Football Association also rejected Jiangsu Fengdong Thermal Technology, a listed associate company of Quanjian Group, to sponsor Jiangsu Yancheng Dingli F.C. in January 2016.

Quanjian Group is the parent company of Dalian Quanjian F.C., which the group owned 80% stake of the women football club.

References

External links
  

Health care companies of China
Companies based in Tianjin
Herbalism organizations